Irish slaves may refer to:
 Slavery in Ireland, the institution of slavery as it existed in Ireland
 Irish indentured servants, Irish people who were transported to the Americas as indentured servants
 Irish slaves myth, a pseudohistorical narrative regarding the comparison of Irish indentured servants to chattel slavery in the Americas